Ramonaka is a village in Kgatleng District of Botswana. The village is located 65 km east of Gaborone, and it has a primary school. The population was 518 in 2001 census.

References

Kgatleng District
Villages in Botswana